Johan Isaaksz Pontanus (21 January 1571–7 October 1639) was a Dutch historiographer.

Pontanus was the son of Margaretha van Delen and Isaac Pietersz, the Dutch consul to Denmark stationed in Helsingør. The painter Pieter Isaacsz (1568–1625) was his older brother. In 1578 his family returned to the Netherlands and Pontanus grew up in Amsterdam. In 1589 he enrolled as a medical student at the University of Franeker and in 1592 at Leiden University as "Joannes Hellespontius Danus", predating the apparent contraction "Pontanus" (he was said to be born at sea near Helsingør in the Danish Hellespont, the Øresund). The next year he defended his  Dissertatio de rationalis animas facilitate  and traveled to Rome, visiting German scholars on his return trip. Subsequently, Pontanus visited Denmark where his parents had returned and became acquainted with Tycho Brahe and Arild Huitfeldt. 1596 he spent mostly in England, visiting Canterbury, Oxford and Stanford. The following years he traveled to German, Swiss and French cities, in part escorting three young family members of Brahe.

In 1604 he was appointed professor at the Gelderse Academie in Harderwijk, where he remained teaching the rest of his life. Pontanus is best known for writing histories of places and countries. His history of Amsterdam (1611) was considered the first of this city. It was controversial enough to be blacklisted by the Roman church. In 1618 he was asked to write a history of Denmark in Latin, for which he was appointed as the Royal Danish official historian; he continued writing this work until his death but only managed to publish the first part in 1631. In 1621 he was asked to write a history of Guelders which he based largely on work of Paulus Merula en Johannes Luntius and finished in 1639.

Pontanus married Annetjen van den Herde (or Heerde, Heede) in May/June 1606 in Amsterdam/Harderwijk. They had at least four children. He died in Harderwijk in 1639, nine years before the academy was officially declared the University of Harderwijk.

Works
Analectorum libri III (Rostock, 1599, in-4°).
Historia urbis et rerum Amstelodamensium (Amsterdam, 1611, in-fol.).
Originum Francicarum libri VI (Harderwijk, 1616, in-4°).
De Pygmæis (Harderwyck,1629, in-4°).
Rerum Danicarum historia (Amsterdam, 1631, in-fol.): first volume only; the 2nd volume was published in Flensburg (1737, in-fol.).
Poematum libri VI (Amsterdam, 1631).
Discussiones historicae (Harderwijk, 1637, in-8°)
Historia geldrica (Harderwijk, 1639).

Notes and references

External links
The Correspondence of Johannes Isacius Pontanus in EMLO

1571 births
1639 deaths
17th-century Dutch historians
Historians of Denmark
Leiden University alumni
University of Franeker alumni
Academic staff of the University of Harderwijk
Writers from Amsterdam
People from Helsingør